Wood apple is a common name for several trees of Aurantioideae with edible fruits and may refer to:
Aegle marmelos ("Bael" in Hindi), a tree native to India
Limonia acidissima ("Vellaga pandu" in Telugu, "Belada Hannu" in Kannada, "Velam Pazham" or "Vizhaam Pazham" in Tamil, Diwul(දිවුල්) in Sinhala), a tree native to South Asia and Southeast Asia east to Java